Jessica Pasaphan is a Thai actress. She first appeared in a 2009 film called Slice together with Arak Amornsupasiri, then by 2010 she then play the role of RungArun "Rung" with Danai Jarunjinda in a 1 in a 4 drama series called Huajai Hae Koon Kao in Pathapee Leh Ruk along with Prin Suparat and Chalida Vijitvongthong in Channel 3.

Filmography

Dramas

Television series
 2015 Club Friday The Series Season 6: Pid Tee... Wai Jai (Club Friday The Series 6 ความรักไม่ผิด ตอน ผิดที่ไว้ใจ) (/GMM 25) as Ef (อีฟ) (Series in 4 episode)
 2021 Let's Fight Ghost (คู่ไฟท์ไฝว้ผี) (True CJ Creations/True4U) as Bow, the lover's partner (EP.10) (โบว์ (รับเชิญ))
 2022 The Warp Effect (รูปลับรหัสวาร์ป) (The One Enterprise-GMMTV/GMM 25) as (Cameos) ( (รับเชิญ))

Television sitcom
 20  (/) as (Cameos)

Films

Music videos
The Best in the World - Instinct & Lula
 2012 Tee Soot Nai Lok Feat.Lula (ที่สุดในโลก) - Instinct (Genie Records/YouTube:GMM GRAMMY OFFICIAL)  
 2013 Yah Ow Kow Mah Gure Ruang Nee (อย่าเอาเขามาเกี่ยวเรื่องนี้) - New Jiew (White Music/YouTube:OfficialWhiteMusic) 
 2013  (คืนนี้สบาย) - Tattoo Colour (Smallroom/YouTube:SMALLROOM)  
 2014  (หน้าที่ตัวสำรอง) - Jeerawan Sorn Sa-Ard (True Fantasia/YouTube:True Fantasia)

Awards

References

External links

1989 births
Living people
People from New Jersey
Jessica Pasaphan
Jessica Pasaphan
Jessica Pasaphan
Jessica Pasaphan
Jessica Pasaphan